Aidan Caves  (born 3 January 1995) is a Canadian professional track cyclist. He won the silver medal at the 2015 Pan American Track Cycling Championships in the scratch and at the 2016 Pan American Track Cycling Championships in the team pursuit also setting the Canadian Record with his teammates. Later he went on to win the gold medal and champions jersey in the Omnium at 2016 Pan American Track Cycling Championships. Back in 2014, he participated at the 2014 Commonwealth Games. In 2018, he won Silver at the 2018 Commonwealth Games He has 11 National Championship wins throughout his career, along with multiple medals at World Cups and three Pan American Titles.

References

External links
 
 

1995 births
Living people
Canadian male cyclists
Canadian track cyclists
Cyclists at the 2014 Commonwealth Games
Cyclists at the 2018 Commonwealth Games
Commonwealth Games medallists in cycling
Commonwealth Games bronze medallists for Canada
20th-century Canadian people
21st-century Canadian people
Medallists at the 2018 Commonwealth Games